Lex or LEX may refer to:

Arts and entertainment
 Lex, a daily featured column in the Financial Times

Games
 Lex, the mascot of the word-forming puzzle video game Bookworm
 Lex, the protagonist of the word-forming puzzle video game Bookworm Adventures

Music
 L.E.X., the third studio album by Liverpool Express
 "Lex", a song from Ratatat's 2006 album Classics
 Lex (album), a mini-album and partial soundtrack by Portland, Oregon duo Visible Cloaks
 Lex Records, an independent record label

Computing
 Amazon Lex,  a service for building conversational interfaces into any application using voice and text
 LEX (cipher), a stream cipher based on the round transformation of AES
 Lex (software), a computer program that generates lexical analyzers
 lex (URN), a URN namespace that allows accurate identification of laws and other legal norms.

Names
 Lex (given name) 
 Lex (surname)

Places
 Lex, West Virginia, an unincorporated community in McDowell County, West Virginia
 Lexington Avenue, an avenue on the East Side of the borough of Manhattan in New York City

Transportation
 Blue Grass Airport (IATA code: LEX), a public airport in Fayette County, Kentucky
 Leading-edge extension, a small extension to an aircraft wing surface
 , an early aircraft carrier built for the United States Navy

Other
 Lex (dog) (1999–2012), the first active duty, fully fit military working dog to be granted early retirement in order to be adopted
 Lex Autolease, the United Kingdom's largest vehicle leasing business
 Lex building, a high-rise of government offices in the European Quarter of Brussels
 Lex XI F.C., a Welsh football team based in Wrexham
 Severe Tropical Storm Lex, a category-1 typhoon in the 1983 Pacific typhoon season
 Lexus, a luxury car brand owned by Toyota

See also
 Leges (disambiguation)
 Lexx, a science fiction television series